The 2012 Superstars Series Pergusa round was the eighth and final races of the 2012 Superstars Series season. It took place on 28 October at the Autodromo di Pergusa.

Raffaele Giammaria won both races, driving a Mercedes C63 AMG.

Classification

Qualifying

Notes:
  – Andrea Larini and Christian Fittipaldi's best times were deleted for exceeding track limits.

Race 1

Race 2

Notes:
  – Simone Iacone was given a 3-second penalty for causing a collision with Thomas Biagi.
  – Massimiliano Mugelli was given a 3-second penalty for causing a collision with Mauro Cesari.
  – Andrea Larini was disqualified for causing a collision with Vitantonio Liuzzi.

Standings after the event

International Series standings

Italian Championship standings

Teams' Championship standings

 Note: Only the top five positions are included for both sets of drivers' standings.

References

2012 in Italian motorsport
Superstars Series seasons